Serge July (born 27 December 1942) is a French journalist, founder of the daily Libération, and a prominent figure in French politics from the 1970s through the 1990s. In recent times, he has been active in French organizations working in support of journalists taken hostage in Syria.

Critics
In 1978, he published an article criticizing the television series Holocaust, invited Pierre Guillaume, negationist founder of the bookstore, La Vieille Taupe and supports the freedom of speech of Robert Faurisson. On July 4, 1983, he was condemned by the 17th chamber of the Paris judicial tribunal, following the complaint of the International League against Racism and Anti-Semitism (LICRA), of having published in a "Courrier readers" of July 31, 1982, an anti-Semitic letter, accused of defamation, incitement to hatred and racial violence.

Works
 (with Alain Geismar) Vers la guerre civile, 1969
 Les années Mitterrand : histoire baroque d'une normalisation inachevée, 1986
 Le salon des artistes, 1989

References

External links
 My Uncle on Eurochannel

1942 births
Living people
French male journalists
French newspaper founders
Journalists from Paris